Paul Benno Marx, OSB (May 8, 1920 – March 20, 2010) was an American Roman Catholic priest and Benedictine monk, family sociologist, writer, and one of the leaders of the anti-abortion movements.

The monk was professed on 11 July 1942 and ordained on June 15, 1947. Marx started the Sociology Department at Saint John's University, Collegeville, Minnesota in 1957 and headed it as a department chair until 1970. Similarly, the sociologist was the driving force in creating the local universitarian Human Life Center (1972), furthermore the anti-abortion organizations Human Life International (HLI, 1981) and Population Research Institute (PRI, 1989).

Family
Benno William Marx was born in St. Michael, Minnesota. He was the fifteenth child of devoutly religious parents, George and Elizabeth, from the dairy farm where he was raised. There were thirteen girls and four boys (three children died in infancy) in the family.

Activism
Marx's book, The Death Peddlers: War on the Unborn, belongs to the basic literature of the anti-abortion movement. The Benedictine Father became a spiritual mentor for his successor at PRI, Steven W. Mosher.

Marx regularly edited material about natural family planning and led HLI until 1999. In 2007, he received HLI's Cardinal von Galen Award. Other recognitions gained by the monk of Saint John's Abbey, Collegeville include the Cardinal John J. O'Connor Pro-Life Award from Legatus (2003), Family Life International'''s "Faithful for Life Award" (2004) as well as PRI's Founder's Award.

 Books 
 The life and work of Virgil Michel. Dissertation, Washington, D.C.: Catholic University of America Press, 1957.
 Virgil Michel And The Liturgical Movement. Collegeville, Minnesota: Liturgical Press, 1957.
 The Death Peddlers: War on the Unborn. Front Royal, Virginia: HLI, reprint, 1998, .
 Death without dignity: Killing for mercy. Collegeville, Minnesota: Liturgical Press, 2nd edition, 1978, ; later in the modified version And Now Euthanasia: HLI, 2nd edition, 1985.
 Fighting for Life: The Further Journeys of Fr Paul Marx. HLI, 1989, .
 Confessions of a Profile Missionary: The Journeys of Fr. Paul Marx. Gaithersburg, Maryland: HLI, 1988, .
 The Apostle of Life. HLI, 1990, .
 The Flying Monk (Still Fighting for Life). HLI, 1990, .
 The Warehouse Priest. HLI, 1993, .
 Faithful for Life– autobiography. HLI, 1997, .
 The Pro-Life Wisdom of Fr. Paul Marx: The Apostle of Life'' – a collection of comments. HLI, 2008, .

References

External links 
 PRI website: Our Founder: Fr. Paul Marx, O.S.B.

American Benedictines
American nonprofit executives
American anti-abortion activists
American Roman Catholic priests
American sociologists
Benedictine monks
Benedictine scholars
College of Saint Benedict and Saint John's University faculty
Founders of academic institutions
1920 births
2010 deaths
People from St. Michael, Minnesota
Writers from Minnesota